Railwayman may refer to:

 A person who works in rail transport
 The Railway Man (book), an autobiography by Eric Lomax, published in 1995
 The Railway Man (film), a film adaptation of the book, starring Colin Firth and Nicole Kidman